Shanab is a surname. In the Bedawi dialect of Sudanese Arabic the word means moustache.

People with the surname include:

 Abdel Fattah Abou-Shanab (born 1935), Egyptian rower
 Ismail Abu Shanab (1950–2003), Palestinian engineer and assassinated Hamas politician
 Mohammad Abu Shanab (born 1998), Qatari footballer
 Nora Shanab (born 1987), Israeli Arab footballer

References

Arabic-language surnames